Navanthurai is a coastal suburb of the city Jaffna city in northern Sri Lanka. In 2007 the population of Navanthurai North was 1,922 and that of Navanthurai South was 1,907.

References

Jaffna DS Division
Suburbs of Jaffna